The third season of British science fiction television series Doctor Who began on 11 September 1965 with the story Galaxy 4 and ended on 16 July 1966 with The War Machines. Only 17 out of 45 episodes survive in the BBC archives; 28 remain missing. As a result, only 3 serials are complete.

Casting

Main cast 
 William Hartnell as the First Doctor
 Maureen O'Brien as Vicki
 Peter Purves as Steven Taylor
 Adrienne Hill as Katarina
 Jean Marsh as Sara Kingdom
 Jackie Lane as Dodo Chaplet
 Anneke Wills as Polly
 Michael Craze as Ben Jackson

For season 3, William Hartnell continued his role as The Doctor, and was joined by Peter Purves as Steven Taylor for a majority of the episodes. Maureen O'Brien, who had been a regular cast member of the previous season, dropped out after episode nine, 'Horse of Destruction,' from The Myth Makers storyline. That episode saw the introduction of Adrienne Hill as Katarina, a short-lived companion whose character would be killed after five episodes. Katarina was then followed by another short-lived companion, portrayed by Jean Marsh. Marsh's character, Sara Kingdom, who appeared in only episodes, all part of The Dalek's Master Plan serial.

After spending the most of The Massacre with Steven Taylor as The Doctor's only companion, Jackie Lane was introduced as Dodo Chaplet. She remained with the show for only 19 episodes, during which Purves left. Lane's final serial was The War Machines, which introduced Anneke Wills and Michael Craze as Polly and Ben Jackson respectively, who would become regulars the following season.

Guest stars

Peter Butterworth makes his second and final appearance as the Meddling Monk in the serial The Daleks' Master Plan, though his presence in the story is limited to three parts only; "Volcano", "Golden Death", and "Escape Switch".

Serials 

John Wiles replaced Verity Lambert as producer after "Mission to the Unknown". Innes Lloyd, in turn, replaced Wiles after The Ark. Donald Tosh continued as script editor until The Massacre: "Priest of Death", and was replaced by Gerry Davis beginning with The Massacre: "Bell of Doom".

The practice of giving each individual episode a different title was abandoned after The Gunfighters, near the end of the season. This season was notable for the longest serial to date, The Daleks' Master Plan, which contained 12 episodes. The record of The Daleks' Master Plan as the longest serial was eventually taken by the 14-part The Trial of a Time Lord, which spanned the whole of Season 23. The single-episode prequel to this story, "Mission to the Unknown", was not only the shortest story, but was notable for the absence of the entire regular cast. The episode came about when Planet of Giants, the opening serial of Season 2, was reduced from four to three episodes, leaving a single episode held over in the production schedule. Rather than attempt to create a single-episode story, or add an episode to an already commissioned story, it was decided to use this one episode as a trailer to set up the upcoming 12-part Dalek story.

Four of the stories from Season 3 ("Mission to the Unknown", The Myth Makers, The Massacre, and The Savages) are completely missing from the BBC archive, with no surviving episodes. Further, "Mission to the Unknown" and The Massacre are two of only three stories from the entire run of Doctor Who with no surviving footage from any sources (the other being Marco Polo from Season 1). Only three of this season's stories (The Ark, The Gunfighters and The War Machines) are complete. "Mission to the Unknown", however, is unique in that it is the only missing episode of Doctor Who to be fully recreated in live-action, with the student-made project having its production quality on par with that of 1960s television.

Season 3 holds the distinction of being the longest-running season of Doctor Who to date, having produced 45 episodes in 10 serials. Season 6 produced just one episode less in 7 serials.

The Massacre was the first serial that saw the lead actor cast in a dual role; William Hartnell not only plays the Doctor, but also the Abbot of Amboise. This would be repeated by Patrick Troughton in Season 5's The Enemy of the World.
: Episode is missing

Missing episodes

Galaxy 4 – Episodes 1, 2 & 4 (of 4 total) (Animated recreations exist)
"Mission to the Unknown" – Single episode (Live-action recreation available)
The Myth Makers – All 4 episodes
The Daleks' Master Plan – Episodes 1, 3, 4, 6 – 9, 11 & 12 (of 12 total)
The Massacre – All 4 episodes
The Celestial Toymaker – Episodes 1, 2 & 3 (of 4 total)
The Savages – All 4 episodes

Home media

VHS releases

DVD and Blu-ray releases

In print

See also 
 List of Doctor Who episodes (1963–1989)

References

Bibliography 

 
 
 

1965 British television seasons
1966 British television seasons
Season 03
Season 03
3
Black-and-white British television shows